The Air Force Space and Missile Museum is located at Launch Complex 26 at Cape Canaveral Space Force Station, Florida.  It includes artifacts from the early American space program and includes an outdoor area displaying rockets, missiles, and space-related equipment chronicling the space and missile history of the US Air Force, the US Space Force and other military branches.

The museum is accessible to the public as a part of the "Cape Canaveral Early Space Tour" offered by the Kennedy Space Center Visitor Complex four days per week.  Free tours were also offered by the former Air Force 45th Space Wing Community Relations office until June 2013. The 45th Space Wing became Space Launch Delta 45 in May 2021 following establishment of the Space Force.

The Sands Space History Center, a companion to the museum, is open to the general public six days a week. The History Center is located just outside the south gate of Cape Canaveral Air Force Station.

Sands Space History Center

The Sands Space History Center (formerly known as the United States Air Force Space and Missile History Center) is an extension of the Air Force Space and Missile Museum outside the gate 1 of the Cape Canaveral Space Force Station which opened to the public August 14, 2010.  It is located in a  facility and highlights the progress and history of the space program.  The museum features displays which chronicle the story of each of the launch pads from its establishment in 1949 as the Joint Long Range Proving Ground.  Exhibits contain artifacts dating back to the 1950s and include parts to launch vehicles and control systems.

Unlike the Air Force Space and Missile Museum, its sister museum which is located inside gates of the Cape Canaveral Space Force Station, the center does not require special arrangements or a fee-based tour to visit.  Admission is free and it is open to the public six days per week.  As of 2017, it is open 9AM-2PM Tuesday through Friday, 9AM-5PM Saturday, and noon-4PM Sunday.

Hangar C
During the museum's early history, an extensive outdoor display (much of which included once flight-capable hardware), known as the "Rocket Garden" provided a large, open-air exhibit area.  Over the years, the central Florida heat, humidity, and ocean air gradually took their toll, degrading the outward appearance and internal structure of most of the exhibits.  One-by-one, these degrading artifacts were removed from outdoor display, professionally refurbished, and returned to a pristine (almost "factory new") appearance.  Not wanting to repeat the process, the museum placed them in protective storage (out of public view) until such time as a suitable display area could be secured.  Toward the end of this years-long process, historic Hangar C was secured as the future public display area.  The oldest hangar on the Cape (Hangars A and B were built on Patrick Space Force Base), for a time served as a central missile assembly facility for nearly all Cape launch activity.  Once it was determined that Hangar C would serve as a central display area for much of the museum's large artifacts, it underwent extensive renovation to make it suitable for public access. In early 2020 public tours conducted by the Kennedy Space Center Visitor Complex began making stops at Hangar C as part of the newly introduced "Rise to Space" tour (separate and distinct from the "Early Space" tour).    The museum provides a volunteer staff, many of whom are seasoned space and missile professionals, to act as exhibit interpreters.

Gallery

See also

Cape Canaveral Launch Complex 26 - contains more photos
Kennedy Space Center Visitor Complex
United States Air Force Space and Missile History Center
Titan Missile Museum

References

External links

 Museum outside base at gate 1 
Air Force Space and Missile Museum Factsheet. Official factsheet prepared by the U.S. Air Force.
Fan sites
Air Force Space and Missile Museum
Air Force Space and Missile Museum Virtual Tour
Historic Launch Pads of CCAFS including LC-26 Air Force Space and Missile Museum

Aerospace museums in Florida
Air force museums in the United States
Cape Canaveral Space Force Station
History centers
Military and war museums in Florida
Museums in Brevard County, Florida
Space-related tourist attractions
Museums established in 1966
1966 establishments in Florida